All Too Well: The Short Film is a 2021 romantic drama short film written and directed by American singer-songwriter Taylor Swift in her filmmaking debut. A film adaptation of her critically acclaimed song "All Too Well" (2012), it is set against the backdrop of the uncut, 10-minute version of the song released in 2021. It stars Sadie Sink and Dylan O'Brien as a romantic couple whose up-and-down relationship ultimately falls apart, compounded by their age gap. Swift cited the works of Barbara Stanwyck, John Cassavetes and Noah Baumbach as artistic influences upon her film.

Produced by Saul Projects and Taylor Swift Productions, All Too Well: The Short Film was released on November 12, 2021, in select theaters by Universal Pictures and on YouTube by PolyGram Entertainment and Republic Records, in conjunction with Swift's second re-recorded album Red (Taylor's Version). After a premiere at the AMC Theatres in Lincoln Square, New York City, it had a limited theatrical release in major cities as well as special screenings at the 2022 Tribeca and Toronto film festivals. It enjoyed wide critical acclaim, with particular praise towards Swift's direction as a debut filmmaker as well as the acting, drama, and production values.

The film garnered several awards and nominations from music and film organizations, including an American Music Award, a Grammy Award, a Hollywood Critics Association Award and an Art Directors Guild Award; at the 2022 MTV Video Music Awards, it won Video of the Year and Best Direction, making Swift the first act in VMA history to win Best Direction for a self-directed work.

Synopsis 
All Too Well: The Short Film is a film adaptation of the 2021 song "All Too Well (10 Minute Version) (Taylor's Version) (From the Vault)" by American singer-songwriter Taylor Swift. It also functions as a music video for the song. A literary quote from Chilean poet Pablo Neruda—"Love is so short, forgetting is so long", from his poem "Puedo Escribir Los Versos"—opens the film. The story chronicles the relationship of two doomed lovers, Her and Him, compounded by an age gap. "All Too Well (10 Minute Version)" plays throughout the film, except during a dialogued conflict between Her and Him. The song details a blooming romance between two people, and its subsequent dissolution and resulting heartbreak. The nearly 15-minute film is divided into seven chapters—"An Upstate Escape", "The First Crack in the Glass", "Are You Real?", "The Breaking Point", "The Reeling", "The Remembering", and the epilogue "Thirteen Years Gone"— describing the relationship between Her and Him using various phases.

Plot 

The story starts with the couple lying in bed together, Her mesmerized by Him. They venture into upstate New York in a car. Her leaves her red scarf at a house belonging to Him's sister. Their relationship takes a turn at a dinner party, where Him ignores his girlfriend with a hand gesture, as he is busy catching up with his friends, making Her uncomfortable. They fight afterwards; Him is arrogant and dismissive, while a distraught Her is heartbroken but still wants to stay with Him. He apologizes and kisses Her to end the argument, and they dance in the refrigerator light. Him starts to distance himself from Her, eventually breaking up with her. A devastated Her weeps in bed, ignoring his phone calls. Her is seen typing on her typewriter and crumbling paper sheets. A montage shows Her alone at parties and dismal on her 21st birthday. Him's life carries on as he walks alone down a Brooklyn street, recalling some of the happier moments in his relationship with Her. The film then jumps 13 years into the future, where Her has become an author and released her book All Too Well, presumably detailing the heartache of her early twenties. She reads from the book to an audience in a packed bookstore. Outside the store, an older Him stands in the snow, watching Her through the window, wearing the same scarf she had abandoned 13 years ago.

Conception and production 

Swift stated via her social media that All Too Well: The Short Film was shot on 35 mm film by Japanese-Korean-British cinematographer Rina Yang. Yang used an "Arri Arriflex 235 for handheld and steadicam, and Panavision MXL for dolly work"; lenses were Panavision Primo, with 11:1 Primo zoom. She shot exterior scenes on Kodak Ektachrome—the same kind she had used to shoot the HBO television series Euphoria. Swift cited "Barbara Stanwyck films, particularly 1937's Stella Dallas", as artistic influences upon her film in addition to those of John Cassavetes and Noah Baumbach, especially his drama film Marriage Story (2019), among other works. She also mentioned the films The Way We Were (1973), Love Story (1970), and Kramer vs. Kramer (1979) as sources of inspiration.

Swift said she wanted tell a story about "girlhood calcifying into this bruised adulthood" with the film. On Late Night with Seth Meyers, she said she cast Sink and O'Brien because they were the only two people she imagined playing the roles, noting that she was a fan of O'Brien's works and that she would not have proceeded with making the film had Sink turned down the offer. Swift explained that she likes "working with friends or people who I think would be excited about working with me" and added that she was "just blown away by what [Sink and O'Brien] did—they went out and left it all on the field". Sink stated she accepted Swift's offer without hesitation as she was a fan of Swift and was also interested in playing a "more rounded and mature" role while portraying her Stranger Things character Max Mayfield during production of the series' fourth season. Swift further revealed that Sink and O'Brien "were so electric and [improvising] a lot of what they were doing that we just couldn't take the camera off [them]".

Release and promotion 
In September 2021, Swift announced that her re-recorded album, Red (Taylor's Version), a re-recording of her fourth studio album Red (2012), would be released on November 12, 2021. It contains both the re-recorded version of the track "All Too Well" and its 10-minute uncut version as a bonus track "from the vault". On November 5, 2021, Good Morning America revealed a teaser for the short film. The teaser featured a vintage car driving down on a quiet road surrounded by autumnal trees, as well as the names of the cast members. All Too Well: The Short Film is a dramatized account of the incidents and dynamics of the relationship described in the song. It is about "an effervescent, curious young woman who ends up completely out of her depth", stated Swift. She described it as an expression of her gratitude to her fans for their reception to the song "All Too Well" over the years.

The film's world premiere took place on November 12 at the AMC Theatres in Lincoln Square, New York City with handpicked fans among those who attended. Each audience member received an autographed movie poster and a custom packet of tissues. Swift performed "All Too Well (10 Minute Version)" in the theatre after the screening.  The film was later released on the same day on YouTube, 19 hours after the album's release at midnight. It had a limited theatrical release in major cities.

It was also screened in two film festivals. On June 11, 2022, All Too Well: The Short Film had a special screening at the 2022 Tribeca Film Festival at the Beacon Theatre in New York City. The film was screened in its 35 mm form for the first time at the 2022 Toronto International Film Festival on September 9, 2022, at the TIFF Bell Lightbox in Toronto, Ontario.

A video of behind the scenes from the short film was released on December 8.

Reception

Commercial performance 
Following its release to YouTube, the film was the number-one trending video on the platform with over 14 million views. It amassed 32 million views in its first three days. The short film helped its source material, "All Too Well (10 Minute Version)", debut atop the Billboard Hot 100 chart, garnering Swift her eighth number-one song in the US, and the longest song ever to top the chart—a feat recognized in Guinness World Records. As of December 2022, the film has 80 million views on YouTube.

Critical response 

All Too Well: The Short Film was met with strong acclaim from film critics, with emphasis on Swift's vision as a filmmaker. Variety Ramin Setoodeh dubbed the short film "a music video on steroids meets a Noah Baumbach movie". Brittany Spanos of Rolling Stone called it a "dramatic and moving" film that "digs deep into heartache and scarf lore". Rhian Daly of NME said the film underscores "the emotional power of [Swift's] storytelling" with "devastating" cinematography and "electric performances" by Sink and O'Brien. Collider Ryan Louis Mantilla reported that "Sink and O'Brien bring Swift's characters to life with vividly emotional performances telling an incredibly moving tale of love, power, gaslighting, and heartache in the 15-minute film."

Karl Quinn, in his review for The Sydney Morning Herald, complimented the "gorgeously cliched Notebook-style" screenplay, Swift's direction, and the "finely tuned" performances of Sink and O'Brien. Vogue Sarah Spellings said many of the film's scenes felt like "in-jokes with the audience" and commended the midway dialogue featuring an argument between Sink and O'Brien's characters: "It felt less like a real fight and more like how you describe a fight to your friends later. In other words, it was a depiction of how a fight feels." In USA Today, Patrick Ryan wrote that the film was "operatic in its emotions and scope" and felt the argument scene was "particularly gut-wrenching". Billboard Paul Grein also praised the argument, saying the writing in the scene is "so vivid that it's easy to see Swift winning an Oscar for screenwriting one day".

Laura Coates, publishing on RogerEbert.com, commended Swift's direction, the "meticulous lighting and eye for production design", Yang's camerawork, and the "electric" chemistry between Sink and O'Brien. Coates highlighted the argument scene as well: "Though the instinct may be to emphasize the volatility of their relationship with quick, jarring cuts, the unflinching persistence of the single take means the viewer is left with nothing to do but squirm and despair as we watch their relationship fall apart before our eyes." In a less favorable review, Renaldo Matadeen of Comic Book Resources described the film as a "powerful character portrait" with "great cinematography and clever pacing" but felt that Swift's appearance near the end as a grown Sink "takes away from the artistic, auteur feel" of the film, preventing it from being a "perfect indie film".

The film briefly had the highest rating on film review site Letterboxd before Parasite (2019) regained the status.

Accolades 
All Too Well: The Short Film has received awards recognition in a diverse set of fields. It was nominated in five categories at the 2022 MTV Video Music Awards, including Swift's fifth nomination for Video of the Year,—a record tied with Beyoncé for the most Video of the Year nominations; Swift was also nominated for Best Direction for a third consecutive year, following the music videos of "The Man" in 2020 and "Willow" in 2021. The film won Video of the Year and Best Longform Video, and Swift won Best Direction; she became the first artist to win Video of the Year three times, and the first artist to win Video of the Year for a self-directed video. She won four awards at the 2022 MTV Europe Music Awards, including Best Artist and Best Pop Act for the first time, and tied Lady Gaga as the most awarded woman in EMA history (12 each). Swift won six awards at the 2022 American Music Awards, including Favorite Music Video and Artist of the Year. In 2023, Swift became the first artist to win the Grammy Award for Best Music Video as sole director; it was her second win in the category after "Bad Blood" (2015).

Legacy 

Publications have described the short film as one of the biggest newsmakers and pop culture moments of 2021. iHeartRadio called it a "cultural sensation". It was met with "Oscar buzz", and Google searches of Sink and O'Brien reached an all-time high upon its release. Various media outlets described the short film's absence from the shortlist for the 2023 Academy Award for Best Live Action Short Film a snub.

Canadian singer Michael Bublé, in the music video for his 2022 single "I'll Never Not Love You", referenced and recreated iconic "love scenes" from various films with his wife, Luisana Lopilato; it included All Too Well: The Short Film, with Bublé as Him and Lopilato as Her.

The Department of English of the Queen's University at Kingston, a public research university in Ontario, Canada, offers a fall semester course titled "Taylor Swift's Literary Legacy (Taylor's Version)", with a syllabus requiring students to analyze many of Swift's works, such as All Too Well: The Short Film, to understand their literary references and sociopolitical relevance in contemporary culture.

Following the success of the short film, Swift was inspired to venture further into filmmaking. In December 2022, Searchlight Pictures announced that Swift has written an original script and will direct her debut feature film; details about the cast, plot, and title were withheld "until a later date". She took part in Variety Directors on Directors series opposite British-Irish filmmaker Martin McDonagh to elucidate her filmmaking approach.

See also 

 Folklore: The Long Pond Studio Sessions, a concert documentary directed by Swift in her solo directorial debut.
 Miss Americana, a documentary about Swift's life and career.

Footnotes

References

External links 
 

2020s English-language films
2020s music videos
2021 romantic drama films
2021 short films
American short films
Films based on songs
Films directed by Taylor Swift
Films released on YouTube
Films set in New York (state)
Grammy Award for Best Short Form Music Video
MTV Video Music Award for Best Direction
MTV Video of the Year Award
Music videos directed by Taylor Swift
Taylor Swift